Ewerton da Silva Pereira, known as Ewerton (born 1 December 1992) is a Brazilian footballer who plays as a midfielder for Japanese club Vegalta Sendai on loan from the Portuguese club Portimonense.

Club career
Ewerton started his career at Fluminense. In April 2012, he joined Campeonato Brasileiro Série B club América de Natal on loan. He made his professional debut, on 19 June 2012, in a game against ASA. This was followed by a loan spell at Desportivo Brasil.

In July 2013, Ewerton was loaned to Paulista, where he made five appearances in the Copa Paulista.

In August 2014, Ewerton joined Portuguese club Portimonense, where he won the LigaPro in 2016–17.

Porto
In July 2018, after four seasons at Portimonense, he joined Porto. He signed a four-year contract with the Primeira Liga club.

In January 2019, he joined Urawa Red Diamonds on loan until July 2019. The loan was later extended until the end of 2020.

References

External links
 
 
 

1992 births
Footballers from São Paulo
Living people
Brazilian footballers
Fluminense FC players
América Futebol Clube (RN) players
Paulista Futebol Clube players
Portimonense S.C. players
FC Porto players
Urawa Red Diamonds players
Brazilian expatriate footballers
Expatriate footballers in Portugal
Liga Portugal 2 players
Primeira Liga players
J1 League players
Association football midfielders